Ernest Renshaw and William Renshaw defeated Claude Farrer and Arthur Stanley 6–3, 6–3, 10–8 to win the gentlemen's doubles tennis title at the 1885 Wimbledon Championships.

Draw

Draw

References

External links

Gentlemen's Doubles
Wimbledon Championship by year – Men's doubles